Damian German (born June 17, 1996) is an American soccer player who plays as a forward.

Career

College and amateur 
German played three years of college soccer at Grand Canyon University between 2015 and 2017,  before transferring to San Diego State University for his senior year in 2018.

German also played with USL Premier Development League side FC Tucson in 2016 and 2018.

Professional 
On January 22, 2019, German signed for Real Monarchs of the USL Championship. His option was declined by Real Monarchs following the 2020 season.

References

External links 
 Real Salt Lake 

1996 births
Living people
American soccer players
Association football forwards
FC Tucson players
Grand Canyon Antelopes men's soccer players
Real Monarchs players
San Diego State Aztecs men's soccer players
Soccer players from Phoenix, Arizona
USL Championship players
USL League Two players